Dynamite is an explosive made of nitroglycerin, sorbents (such as powdered shells or clay), and stabilizers. It was invented by the Swedish chemist and engineer Alfred Nobel in Geesthacht, Northern Germany, and patented in 1867. It rapidly gained wide-scale use as a more robust alternative to black powder.

History

Dynamite was invented by Swedish chemist Alfred Nobel in 1866 and was the first safely manageable explosive stronger than black powder.

Alfred Nobel's father, Immanuel Nobel, was an industrialist, engineer, and inventor. He built bridges and buildings in Stockholm and founded Sweden's first rubber factory. His construction work inspired him to research new methods of blasting rock that were more effective than black powder. After some bad business deals in Sweden, in 1838 Immanuel moved his family to Saint Petersburg, where Alfred and his brothers were educated privately under Swedish and Russian tutors. At age 17, Alfred was sent abroad for two years; in the United States he met Swedish engineer John Ericsson and in France studied under famed chemist Théophile-Jules Pelouze and his pupil Ascanio Sobrero, who had first synthesized nitroglycerin in 1847. In France Nobel encountered nitroglycerin, which Pelouze cautioned against using as a commercial explosive because of its great sensitivity to shock.

In 1857, Nobel filed the first of several hundred patents, mostly concerning air pressure, gas and fluid gauges, but remained fascinated with nitroglycerin's potential as an explosive. Nobel, along with his father and brother Emil, experimented with various combinations of nitroglycerin and black powder. Nobel came up with a solution of how to safely detonate nitroglycerin by inventing the detonator, or blasting cap, that allowed a controlled explosion set off from a distance using a fuse. In 1863 Nobel performed his first successful detonation of pure nitroglycerin, using a blasting cap made of a copper percussion cap and mercury fulminate. In 1864, Alfred Nobel filed patents for both the blasting cap and his method of synthesizing nitroglycerin, using sulfuric acid, nitric acid and glycerin. On 3 September 1864, while experimenting with nitroglycerin, Emil and several others were killed in an explosion at the factory at Immanuel Nobel's estate at Heleneborg. After this, Alfred founded the company Nitroglycerin Aktiebolaget in Vinterviken to continue work in a more isolated area and the following year moved to Germany, where he founded another company, Dynamit Nobel.

Despite the invention of the blasting cap, the instability of nitroglycerin rendered it useless as a commercial explosive. To solve this problem, Nobel sought to combine it with another substance that would make it safe for transport and handling but would not reduce its effectiveness as an explosive. He tried combinations of cement, coal, and sawdust, but was unsuccessful. Finally, he tried diatomaceous earth, fossilized algae, that he brought from the Elbe River near his factory in Hamburg, which successfully stabilized the nitroglycerin into a portable explosive.

Nobel obtained patents for his inventions in England on 7 May 1867 and in Sweden on 19 October 1867. After its introduction, dynamite rapidly gained wide-scale use as a safe alternative to black powder and nitroglycerin. Nobel tightly controlled the patents, and unlicensed duplicating companies were quickly shut down. A few American businessmen got around the patent by using absorbents other than diatomaceous earth, such as resin.

Nobel originally sold dynamite as "Nobel's Blasting Powder" but decided to change the name to dynamite, from the Ancient Greek word dýnamis, meaning "power".

Manufacture

Form
A stick of dynamite thus produced contains roughly 1 MJ (megajoule) of energy. Other sizes also exist, rated by either portion (Quarter-Stick or Half-Stick) or by weight.

Dynamite is usually rated by "weight strength" (the amount of nitroglycerin it contains), usually from 20% to 60%. For example, 40% dynamite is composed of 40% nitroglycerin and 60% "dope" (the absorbent storage medium mixed with the stabilizer and any additives).

Storage considerations
The maximum shelf life of nitroglycerin-based dynamite is recommended as one year from the date of manufacture under good storage conditions.

Over time, regardless of the sorbent used, sticks of dynamite will "weep" or "sweat" nitroglycerin, which can then pool in the bottom of the box or storage area. For that reason, explosive manuals recommend the regular up-ending of boxes of dynamite in storage. Crystals will form on the outside of the sticks, causing them to be even more sensitive to shock, friction, and temperature. Therefore, while the risk of an explosion without the use of a blasting cap is minimal for fresh dynamite, old dynamite is dangerous. Modern packaging helps eliminate this by placing the dynamite into sealed plastic bags and using wax-coated cardboard.

Dynamite is moderately sensitive to shock. With a hammer of 2 kg, mercury fulminate detonates with a drop distance of 1 to 2 cm, nitroglycerin with 4 to 5 cm, dynamite with 15 to 30 cm, and ammoniacal explosives with 40 to 50 cm.

Major manufacturers

South Africa
For several decades beginning in the 1940s, the largest producer of dynamite in the world was the Union of South Africa. There the De Beers company established a factory in 1902 at Somerset West. The explosives factory was later operated by AECI (African Explosives and Chemical Industries). The demand for the product came mainly from the country's vast gold mines, centered on the Witwatersrand. The factory at Somerset West was in operation in 1903 and by 1907 it was already producing 340,000 cases,  each, annually. A rival factory at Modderfontein was producing another 200,000 cases per year.

There were two large explosions at the Somerset West plant during the 1960s. Some workers died, but the loss of life was limited by the modular design of the factory and its earth works, and the planting of trees that directed the blasts upward. There were several other explosions at the Modderfontein factory. After 1985, pressure from trade unions forced AECI to phase out the production of dynamite. The factory then went on to produce ammonium nitrate emulsion-based explosives that are safer to manufacture and handle.

United States
Dynamite was first manufactured in the US by the Giant Powder Company of San Francisco, California, whose founder had obtained the exclusive rights from Nobel in 1867. Giant was eventually acquired by DuPont, which produced dynamite under the Giant name until Giant was dissolved by DuPont in 1905.
Thereafter, DuPont produced dynamite under its own name until 1911–12, when its explosives monopoly was broken up by the U.S. Circuit Court in the "Powder Case". Two new companies were formed upon the breakup, the Hercules Powder Company and the Atlas Powder Company, which took up the manufacture of dynamite (in different formulations).

Currently, only Dyno Nobel manufactures dynamite in the US. The only facility producing it is located in Carthage, Missouri, but the material is purchased from Dyno Nobel by other manufacturers who put their labels on the dynamite and boxes.

Non-dynamite explosives
Other explosives are often referred to or confused with dynamite:

TNT
TNT is most commonly assumed to be the same as (or confused for) dynamite, largely due to the ubiquity of both explosives during the 20th century and the civilian practice of preparing dynamite charges in  "sticks" wrapped in red waxed paper and shaped to fit the cylindrical boreholes drilled in the rock face. This incorrect connection between TNT and dynamite was enhanced by Bugs Bunny cartoons where animators started labeling any kind of cartoon bomb (ranging from sticks of dynamite to kegs of black powder) as "TNT" because the acronym was shorter and more memorable and did not require literacy to recognize "TNT" meant "bomb" (similar to the use of XXX markings on whiskey bottles and barrels in cartoons). This eventually led to the general perception that TNT and dynamite were one and the same.

In actuality, aside from both being high explosives, TNT and dynamite have very little in common: TNT, or trinitrotoluene, is a second generation castable explosive adopted by the military. The German armed forces adopted it as a filling for artillery shells in 1902, some 40 years after the invention of dynamite, which is a first generation phlegmatized explosive primarily intended for civilian earthmoving. TNT has never been popular or widespread in civilian earthmoving, as it is considerably more expensive and less powerful by weight than dynamite, as well as being slower to mix and pack into cylindrical boreholes; for its part, dynamite has never been popular in warfare because it degenerates quickly under severe conditions and can be detonated by either fire or a wayward bullet. Accordingly, more than 90% of the TNT produced in America was always for the military market, with most filling shells, hand grenades and aerial bombs and the remainder being packaged in brown "bricks" (not red cylinders) for use as demolition charges by combat engineers.

"Extra" dynamite
In the United States, in 1885, the chemist Russell S. Penniman invented "ammonium dynamite", a form of explosive that used ammonium nitrate as a substitute for the more costly nitroglycerin. Ammonium nitrate has only 85% of the chemical energy of nitroglycerin.

It is rated by either "weight strength" (the amount of ammonium nitrate in the medium) or "cartridge strength" (the potential explosive strength generated by an amount of explosive of a certain density and grain size used in comparison to the explosive strength generated by an equivalent density and grain size of a standard explosive). For example, high-explosive 65% Extra dynamite has a weight strength of 65% ammonium nitrate and 35% "dope" (the absorbent medium mixed with the stabilizers and additives). Its "cartridge strength" would be its weight in pounds times its strength in relation to an equal amount of ANFO (the civilian baseline standard) or TNT (the military baseline standard). For example, 65% ammonium dynamite with a 20% cartridge strength would mean the stick was equal to an equivalent weight strength of 20% ANFO.

"Military dynamite"
"Military dynamite" is a dynamite substitute, formulated without nitroglycerin. It contains 75% RDX, 15% TNT, 5% SAE 10 motor oil, and 5% cornstarch, but is much safer to store and handle for long periods than Nobel's dynamite. Military dynamite substitutes much more stable chemicals for nitroglycerin.

Regulation

Various countries around the world have enacted explosives laws and require licenses to manufacture, distribute, store, use, and possess explosives or ingredients.

See also
 Blast fishing
 Blasting machine
 Dynamite gun
 Nobel Prize
 Relative effectiveness factor

References

Further reading
 Cartwright, A. P. (1964). The dynamite Company: The Story of African Explosives and Chemical Industries Limited. Cape Town: Purnell & Sons (S.A.) (Pty) Ltd.
 
 Schück, H. and Sohlman, R. (1929). The Life of Alfred Nobel. London: William Heinemann Ltd.

External links

 Alfred Nobel’s dynamite companies
 Oregon State Police – Arson and Explosives Section (Handling instructions and photos)
 
 Improved process of producing an explosive compound 
 dynamite and TNT at The Periodic Table of Videos (University of Nottingham)

Alfred Nobel
Explosives
Swedish inventions
1867 introductions
19th-century inventions